Athanasios Tolios (born 7 December 1976) is a Greek football goalkeeper.

References

1976 births
Living people
Greek footballers
Edessaikos F.C. players
Veria F.C. players
Ethnikos Asteras F.C. players
Panserraikos F.C. players
PAS Giannina F.C. players
Pierikos F.C. players
Trikala F.C. players
Iraklis Psachna F.C. players
Aiginiakos F.C. players
Anagennisi Giannitsa F.C. players
Super League Greece players
Association football goalkeepers
People from Pieria (regional unit)
Footballers from Central Macedonia